Chen Biao (born November 23, 1923 –) was a Chinese astronomer specialized in solar phyiscs. He is a member of the Chinese Academy of Sciences.

References 

1923 births
Members of the Chinese Academy of Sciences